Macrosonics is the use of high amplitude sound waves for industrial applications. Applications include gas compression, cleaning of surfaces, plastic and metal welding, metal forming, machining, and chemical processing.

See also 

Megasonic cleaning

References

Sound